Shivraj (1920 - 3 June 2017) was an Indian actor.

Selected filmography

Singaar (1949)
Andolan (1951) (He played a key role)
Patita (1953)
Devdas (1955)
Seema (1955)
Dekh Kabira Roya (1957)
Miss Mary (1957)
Paigham (1959)
Ujala (1959)
 Jija Ji (1961) (Punjabi film)
Junglee (1961)
Rakhi (1962)
Bharosa (1963)
Rajkumar (1964)
Janwar (1965)
Do Badan (1966)Mera Saaya (1966)Pyar Kiye Jaa (1966)Baharon Ke Sapne (1967)Shagird (1967)Aadmi (1968)Saraswatichandra (1968)Do Raaste (1969)Adhikar (1971)Anamika (1973)Yaadon Ki Baaraat (1973)Imaan (1974)Naya Din Nai Raat (1974)Ujala Hi Ujala (1974)Resham Ki Dori (1974)Aa Jaa Sanam (1975)Jaggu (1975)Salaakhen (1975)Uljhan (1975)Amar Akbar Anthony (1977)Do Musafir (1978)Kasme Vaade (1978)Rahu Ketu (1978)Sarkari Mehmaan (1979)Inspector Eagle (1979)
 Jwalamukhi (1980 film)Katilon Ke Kaatil (1981)Dil-e-Nadaan (1982)Bade Dil Wala (1983)Avtaar(1983)
 All Rounder (1984) Hum Hain Lajawab (1984)Aakhir Kyon? (1985)Mard (1985)Ilzaam (1986)Aap Ke Saath (1986)Ek Aur Sikander (1986)Dil Ke Jharoke Main (1997)Mrityudand'' (1997)

Television

References

External links

1920s births
2017 deaths
20th-century Indian male actors
Male actors in Hindi cinema
Date of birth unknown